Keith Scott (born 9 June 1967) is a former professional footballer who played as a striker.

Scott had a nomadic career playing for no less than 21 different teams. He played professional football with Lincoln City, Wycombe Wanderers, Swindon Town, Stoke City, Norwich City, AFC Bournemouth, Watford, Reading and Colchester United.

Playing career
Scott was born in the City of Westminster before moving to Leicester. He began playing non-league football with Hinckley Athletic, Bedworth United and Leicester United before turning professional with Lincoln City in 1990. Whilst with Lincoln he spent time out on loan at Gateshead and Boston United before playing for Conference side Wycombe Wanderers. He returned to League football with Swindon Town scoring four goals in the Premier League. After scoring 12 goals for Swindon he moved to Stoke City in December 1994 but he endured a torrid spell at the Victoria Ground scoring just four goals and was swapped with Norwich City for their forward Mike Sheron.

He struggled to find any kind of consistency and went on to play for AFC Bournemouth, Watford, Wycombe Wanderers, Reading and Colchester United before dropping back into non-league football. He played for Dover Athletic, Scarborough, Leigh RMI, Dagenham & Redbridge, Tamworth, Windsor & Eton and finally Northwood.

Managerial career
A UEFA 'A' and 'B' licence holder, he was appointed Manager of Leighton Town in October 2006. A shortage of players forced Scott to take the field against Dunstable Town in January 2007 in the unusual position of goalkeeper, a position he had never previously occupied. Scott met with success at Leighton. They were eleven points from safety at the bottom of the Southern League Division One Midlands when he was appointed, but he led them to safety and also to victory in the Buckingham Senior Charity Cup Final in May 2007. In the 2007–08 season, he steered the club to their most successful campaign in the FA Cup, reaching the Fourth Qualifying Round where they were defeated by Havant & Waterlooville. In December 2007, Scott resigned his post to take up the managerial reins at Windsor & Eton.

Scott left Windsor & Eton FC the season before their demise.

Career statistics

Honours
Wycombe Wanderers
 Football Conference: 1992–93
 FA Trophy: 1990–91, 1992–93

References
 Specific

 General
Canary Citizens by Mark Davage, John Eastwood, Kevin Platt, published by Jarrold Publishing, (2001),

External links
 Career information at ex-canaries.co.uk
 

1967 births
Living people
English footballers
Association football forwards
Premier League players
Footballers from the City of Westminster
English Football League players
Hinckley Athletic F.C. players
Bedworth United F.C. players
Leicester United F.C. players
Lincoln City F.C. players
Gateshead F.C. players
Boston United F.C. players
Wycombe Wanderers F.C. players
Swindon Town F.C. players
Stoke City F.C. players
Norwich City F.C. players
AFC Bournemouth players
Watford F.C. players
Reading F.C. players
Colchester United F.C. players
Dover Athletic F.C. players
Scarborough F.C. players
Leigh Genesis F.C. players
Dagenham & Redbridge F.C. players
Tamworth F.C. players
Windsor & Eton F.C. players
Northwood F.C. players
English football managers
Leighton Town F.C. managers
Windsor & Eton F.C. managers
Windsor F.C. managers